Allegheny County Office Building located at Ross Street and Forbes Avenue in downtown Pittsburgh, Pennsylvania, was built from 1929 to 1931.  It was added to the List of Pittsburgh History and Landmarks Foundation Historic Landmarks in 2002.

References

External links

Office buildings in Pittsburgh
Government buildings completed in 1931
Government buildings in Pittsburgh
1931 establishments in Pennsylvania